Diaspora, a scattered population whose origin lies in a separate locale
Expatriate, a person residing in a country other than their native country
 Overseas Chinese
 Overseas Citizenship of India
 Overseas Filipinos
 Overseas Filipino Worker
 Overseas Vietnamese

Outremer or Crusader states, four Roman Catholic polities
Overseas collectivity, an administrative division of France
Overseas constituency, an electoral district outside of a nation-state's borders
Overseas countries and territories, territories dependent on an EU member state
Overseas country of France, a designation for French Polynesia
Overseas department and region, a department of overseas France
Overseas France, the French-administered territories outside Europe
Overseas province, a non-continental holding of Portugal
Overseas territory, a separated dependent or constituent part of a country

As title in popular culture
Overseas may refer to:
Overseas (album), a 1957 album by pianist Tommy Flanagan and his trio
Overseas (band), an American indie rock band
Overseas, a 2018 song by American rappers Desiigner and Lil Pump
"Overseas" (Tee Grizzley song), a 2019 song from Scriptures by American rapper Tee Grizzley
Overseas, a 2021 song from Home Alone 2 by British rap collective D-Block Europe featuring Central Cee
Overseas RUFC, a Maltese rugby club
"Overseas", a 2016 song by rappers Smoke Dawg and Skepta